Here Come the 123s is the third children's album (and thirteenth studio album) by They Might Be Giants. It is the sequel to the group's 2005 album Here Come the ABCs. The songs are edutainment music aimed at kids, this time dealing with numbers. Like ABCs, there is a CD and DVD. It was initially set to be released on October 2, 2007, but was pushed back to February 5, 2008.

Reception

Soon after its release, the album rose to the #1 position in the Amazon.com Children's Music Bestsellers, and even rose into the top 10 overall music bestsellers on the site. The album won a Grammy award in 2009 for "Best Musical Album For Children".

Track listing
All songs written by They Might Be Giants, except as noted.
 "Here Come the 123s" – 0:08
 "Zeroes" – 1:06
 "One Everything" – 2:52
 "Number Two" (Danny Weinkauf) – 2:19
 "Triops Has Three Eyes" – 2:35
 "Apartment Four" – 1:21
 "High Five!" (Marty Beller) – 2:23
 "The Secret Life of Six" – 2:01
 "Seven" – 2:09
 "Seven Days of the Week (I Never Go to Work)" (Traditional) (featuring Mark Pender on trumpet) – 1:54
 "Figure Eight" – 2:36
 "Pirate Girls Nine" – 1:21
 "Nine Bowls of Soup" – 2:12
 "Ten Mississippi" – 0:51
 "One Dozen Monkeys" – 1:34
 "Eight Hundred and Thirteen Mile Car Trip" (They Might Be Giants/Timothy James Cawley) – 0:57
 "Infinity" (Dan Miller/Robert Sharenow) – 3:13
 "I Can Add" – 2:04
 "Nonagon" – 1:23
 "Even Numbers" – 2:35
 "Ooh La! Ooh La!" – 1:56
 "Heart of the Band" – 1:39
 "Hot Dog!" – 2:29
 "Mickey Mouse Clubhouse Theme" – 0:57
 "One Two Three Four" (Amazon Bonus Track) – 1:11
 "John Lee Supertaster (Live)" (Amazon Bonus Track) – 3:09
 "Bed, Bed, Bed (Live)" (Amazon Bonus Track) – 2:13

DVD
 "Here Come the 123s"
 "Zeroes"
 "One Everything"
 "Number Two"
 "Triops Has Three Eyes"
 "Apartment Four"
 "High Five!"
 "The Secret Life of Six"
 "Seven"
 "Seven Days of the Week (I Never Go to Work)"
 "Figure Eight"
 "Pirate Girls Nine"
 "Nine Bowls of Soup"
 "Ten Mississippi"
 "One Dozen Monkeys"
 "Eight Hundred and Thirteen Mile Car Trip"
 "I Can Add"
 "Nonagon"
 "Even Numbers"
 "Ooh La! Ooh La!"
 "Heart of the Band"
 "Hot Dog!"
 "Mickey Mouse Clubhouse Theme"
 "One Two Three Four" (Amazon Bonus Track)

Personnel

Musicians
 John Flansburgh - lead and backing vocals, acoustic and electric guitars
 John Linnell - lead and backing vocals, accordion, piano, saxophone
 Dan Miller - electric guitar, piano, lead vocals on "Infinity"
 Danny Weinkauf - bass guitar, lead vocals on "The Number Two"
 Marty Beller - drums, lead vocals on "High Five!" and "Hot Dog! (second verse)"
 Robin Goldwasser - lead vocals on "Ten Mississippi" and "Ooh La! Ooh La!"
 Hannah Levine - lead vocals on "High Five!", "One Dozen Monkeys", "I Can Add" and "Ooh La! Ooh La!"
 Mark Pender - trumpet on "The Seven Days of the Week (I Never Go to Work)"
 Dan Levine - trombone on "Hot Dog!", tuba on "Mickey Mouse Clubhouse Theme"

Production crew
 Executive Producer: David Agnew
 Produced by Pat Dillett and They Might Be Giants
 Engineered & Mixed by Pat Dillett

Video production crew
 DVD Produced by Walt Disney Studios Home Entertainment In Association with Idewild Records
 Music Performed by They Might Be Giants
 Visuals Produced by Pat Dillett
 Directed by AJ Schnack
 Flansurgh & Linnell Cutscenes Directed by Feel Good Anyway
 Videos Animated by David Cowles, Jeremy Galante and Divya Srinivasan
 Animation Produced at Asterisk, Colormovie, DHX Media Ltd., Feel Good Anyway and Walt Disney Television Animation

References

External links
 Here Come the 123s at This Might Be A Wiki

2008 albums
They Might Be Giants albums
Albums produced by Pat Dillett
Children's music albums by American artists
Disney Sound albums
Grammy Award for Best Musical Album for Children
Idlewild Recordings albums
Kindie rock albums
Walt Disney Records video albums